In Greek mythology, Admetus (Ancient Greek:  Admetos means 'untamed, untameable') was a king of Pherae in Thessaly.

Biography 
Admetus succeeded his father Pheres after whom the city was named. His mother was identified as Periclymene or Clymene. He was one of the Argonauts and took part in the Calydonian Boar hunt. Admetus' wife Alcestis offered to substitute her own death for his. The most famous of Admetus's children was Eumelus, who led a contingent from Pherae to fight in the Trojan War. He also had a daughter Perimele.

Mythology

Divine herdsman 
Admetus was famed for his hospitality and justice. When Apollo was sentenced to a year of servitude to a mortal as punishment for killing Delphyne, or as later tradition has it, the Cyclopes, the god was sent to Admetus' home to serve as his herdsman. Apollo in recompense for Admetus' treatment made all the cows bear twins while he served as his cowherd.

The romantic nature of their relationship was first described by Callimachus of Alexandria, who wrote that Apollo was "fired with love" for Admetus. Plutarch lists Admetus as one of Apollo's lovers and says that Apollo served Admetus because he doted upon him. Latin poet Ovid in his Ars Amatoria said that even though he was a god, Apollo forsook his pride and stayed in as a servant for the sake of Admetus. Tibullus describes Apollo's love to the king as servitium amoris (slavery of love) and asserts that Apollo became his servant not by force but by choice.

Apollo later helped Admetus win the hand of Alcestis, the daughter of Pelias, king of Iolcus. Alcestis had so many suitors that Pelias set an apparently impossible task to the suitors—to win the hand of Alcestis, they must yoke a boar and a lion to a chariot. Apollo harnessed the yoke with the animals and Admetus drove the chariot to Pelias, and thus married Alcestis.

Admetus, however, neglected to sacrifice to Artemis, Apollo's sister. The offended goddess filled the bridal chamber with snakes and again, Apollo came to Admetus' aid. Apollo advised Admetus to sacrifice to Artemis, and the goddess removed the snakes.

Heroism of Alcestis 

The greatest aid Apollo gave to Admetus was persuading the Fates to reprieve Admetus of his fated day of death. According to Aeschylus Apollo made the Fates drunk, and the Fates agreed to reprieve Admetus if he could find someone to die in his place. Admetus initially believed that one of his aged parents would happily take their son's place of death. When they were unwilling, Alcestis instead died for Admetus.

The scene of death is described in Euripides' play Alcestis, where Thanatos, the god of death, takes Alcestis to the Underworld. As Alcestis descends, Admetus discovers that he actually does not want to live:

The situation was saved by Heracles, who rested at Pherae on his way towards the man-eating Mares of Diomedes. Heracles was greatly impressed by Admetus's kind treatment of him as a guest, and when told of Admetus' situation, he entered Alcestis' tomb. He repaid the honor Admetus had done to him by wrestling with Thanatos until the god agreed to release Alcestis, then led her back into the mortal world. According to other accounts, Persephone, queen of the Underworld instead brought Alcestis back to the upper world.

Gallery

Notes

References 
Aeschylus, translated in two volumes. 2. Eumenides by Herbert Weir Smyth, Ph.D. Cambridge, MA. Harvard University Press. 1926. Online version at the Perseus Digital Library. Greek text available from the same website.
Apollodorus, The Library with an English Translation by Sir James George Frazer, F.B.A., F.R.S. in 2 Volumes, Cambridge, MA, Harvard University Press; London, William Heinemann Ltd. 1921. ISBN 0-674-99135-4. Online version at the Perseus Digital Library. Greek text available from the same website.
Callimachus, Callimachus and Lycophron with an English translation by A. W. Mair ; Aratus, with an English translation by G. R. Mair, London: W. Heinemann, New York: G. P. Putnam 1921. Internet Archive
Callimachus, Works. A.W. Mair. London: William Heinemann; New York: G.P. Putnam's Sons. 1921. Greek text available at the Perseus Digital Library.
Gaius Julius Hyginus, Fabulae from The Myths of Hyginus translated and edited by Mary Grant. University of Kansas Publications in Humanistic Studies. Online version at the Topos Text Project.
Graves, Robert, The Greek Myths, Harmondsworth, London, England, Penguin Books, 1960. 
Graves, Robert, The Greek Myths: The Complete and Definitive Edition. Penguin Books Limited. 2017. 
Kerényi, Carl, The Gods of the Greeks, Thames and Hudson, London, 1951.
March, J. Cassell's Dictionary Of Classical Mythology. London, 1999. 

Argonauts
Princes in Greek mythology
Mythological kings of Pherae
Kings in Greek mythology
Male lovers of Apollo
Male lovers of Heracles
Characters in the Argonautica
Thessalian characters in Greek mythology
Deeds of Apollo
Deeds of Artemis
LGBT themes in Greek mythology